Microtis unifolia, commonly known as the common onion orchid, is a species of orchid occurring from south China to Japan, Malesia, and Australasia to the Southwest Pacific. It has a single green leaf and up to one hundred small green or yellowish-green flowers. A common, widespread orchid which is easily grown in pots and is sometimes a weed in plant nurseries.

Description
Between ten and one hundred green or yellowish-green flowers are arranged on a  length of the flowering stem. The petals are lance-shaped or egg-shaped and curved, shorter than the dorsal sepal and partly hidden by it. Its edges are notched, wrinkled or wavy and there is a saddle-shaped labellum in its centre. Flowering occurs from October to January in Australia, but somewhat later in New Zealand

Taxonomy and naming
The common onion orchid was first formally described in 1786 by Georg Forster, who gave it the name Ophrys unifolia and published the description in Florulae Insularum Australium Prodromus. In 1871, Heinrich Gustav Reichenbach changed the name to Microtis unifolia. The specific epithet (unifolia) is derived from the Latin word unus meaning "one" and the folium meaning “leaf”.

Distribution and habitat
Microtis unifolia occurs in a wide range of habitats from swamps to rocky outcrops in semi-arid areas. It is common in disturbed areas such as pine plantations, and in New Zealand it grows in lawns in urban areas and even in mossy crevices in old buildings. It is a variable species and similarities with other Microtis species leads to confusion as to its range but it is recognised as occurring in New South Wales, Queensland, South Australia and Victoria as well as on both main islands and many of the smaller islands of New Zealand. Its range also extends to New Caledonia, Polynesia, the Philippines, Indonesia, Japan and China.

References

External links
 
 

Flora of China
Flora of Eastern Asia
Flora of Malesia
Flora of Australasia
Flora of the Southwestern Pacific
unifolia
Plants described in 1786